Nathan Kuta (Kuta Niayingwanda)  (born 28 April 2000) is a Belgian-Dutch basketball player, who currently plays for Spirou of the BNXT League and the .

Early career
Kuta was born in the Netherlands. When he was eleven years old, he moved with his family to Belgium. He started in Bree Basket in 2013 and the next year, he went to Cuva Houthalen. He played in U16, U18 and senior basketball with Cuva Houthalen, in the Belgian second division.

Professional career
In August 2018, Kuta signed a one-year contract with Limburg United of the Belgian Pro Basketball League.

On 12 June 2020, Kuta signed with Okapi Aalst.

On 19 July 2021, Kuta signed a three-year contract with Spirou.

National team career
As a citizen of both Belgium and the Netherlands, Kuta had the option to choose either national team. Stating that he felt "that Belgium did not really believe in him", he chose the Netherlands. With the Under-18 team, Kuta won the 2018 FIBA Europe Under-18 Championship Division B. After the tournament, Kuta was named the most valuable player of the tournament after averaging 14.6 points and 10.9 rebounds per game.

On 16 November 2018, Kuta was selected by head coach Toon van Helfteren to be a part of the Netherlands senior team for the first time.

Honors
Netherlands Under-18
2018 FIBA Europe Under-18 Championship Division B: 
2018 FIBA Europe Under-18 Championship Division B MVP
2018 FIBA Europe Under-18 Championship Division B All-Tournament Team

References

2000 births
Belgian men's basketball players
Centers (basketball)
Dutch men's basketball players
Living people
Limburg United players
Okapi Aalstar players
Spirou Charleroi players